Bachelor in Paradise may refer to:

Bachelor in Paradise (film), a 1961 American film starring Bob Hope and Lana Turner
Bachelor in Paradise (American TV series), a 2014 ABC reality series and part of The Bachelor franchise
Bachelor In Paradise (Australian TV series), the Australian version of the series
Bachelor in Paradise Canada, the Canadian version of the series